Scent Dance IV ( 香之舞 IV ) is a work for solo piano, 
composed by He Xuntian in 2012.

Summary
He Xuntian adopted RD Composition and SS Composition in his work Scent Dance IV.

Inspiration
Scent Dance IV was inspired from Xuntian He's ideology:
 Udumbara don't smell like papaver.
 Five Nons: Non-Western, non-Eastern, non-academic, non-folk, and non-non.

References

External links
Scent Dance IV, Dances of Our Time published by Schott Musik International, Germany
Scent Dance IV - Petrushka Project, YouTube

Compositions for piano by He Xuntian
Compositions for solo piano
2012 compositions